This article details Oldham Athletic A.F.C.'s season in League One during the 2007–08 season.

Club

Players 
As of 15 March 2008:

Statistics leaders 
 Club Statistics | Oldham Athletic

Transfers

In

Out

Loan in

Loan out

League position

Results

Legend

League One

FA Cup

League Cup

Football League Trophy

References

External links 
 Oldham Athletic official website
 Trust Oldham website (Supporters Trust)
 Sky Sports
 BBC Sport

Oldham Athletic A.F.C. seasons
Oldham Athletic